The following lists power stations in East Timor.

The Hera power station was built to supply to the North coast of the country, while the Betano power station supplies electricity to the South coast and the Inur Sakato thermal power station provides electricity to the Oecusse District.

References

East Timor
Power stations in East Timor